The Field Naturalists Club of Victoria (FNCV) is an Australian natural history and conservation organisation.

It was founded in May 1880 by a group of nature enthusiasts that included Thomas Pennington Lucas.  Charles French and Dudley Best. It is the oldest conservation group in [Australia]. Since 1884 it has published a journal, The Victorian Naturalist, which is issued six times a year.

Currently there are eight special interest groups (SIGs) within the FNCV, these are Botany, Fauna Survey, Fungi, Geology, Juniors, Marine Research, Microscopy and Terrestrial Invertebrates. The club also has a Day Group.

The FNCV is situated at 1 Gardenia St, Blackburn, in Melbourne's eastern suburbs. A range of services are available for members including a bookshop.

Since 1940 the FNCV has awarded the Australian Natural History Medallion to the person judged to have made the most meritorious contribution to the understanding of Australian Natural History.

Presidents
Past presidents include:

 Frank Dobson (1884)
 Arthur Henry Shakespeare Lucas (1887–1889)
 Walter Baldwin Spencer (1891–1893)
 Thomas Sergeant Hall (1901–1903)
 Francis George Allman Barnard (1905–1907)
 George Arthur Keartland (1907–1909)
 Edward Edgar Pescott (1926–1928)
 Charles Barrett (1930–1931)
 Stanley Robert Mitchell (1936–1937)
 Philip Crosbie Morrison (1941–1943)
 Ina Watson (First female President) (1947–1948)

Regional groups
The FNCV has informal links to a number of regional field naturalist groups across Victoria, including:

 Ballarat Field Naturalists Club
 Bendigo Field Naturalists Club
 Castlemaine Field Naturalists Club
 Portland Field Naturalists Club
 Geelong Field Naturalists Club
 Maryborough Field Naturalists Club

See also
Field Naturalists Society of South Australia

References

External links
 Field Naturalists Club of Victoria

Nature conservation organisations based in Australia
1880 establishments in Australia